Sangeetha Sringeri is an Indian actress who primarily works in Kannada language. She is popularly known as Sathi/Parvatii for her role in the Kannada daily soap Hara Hara Mahadeva. She finished in the top 10 at the Femina Miss India beauty pageant in 2014 and was runner up at the world supermodel contest.

Early and personal life 
Sangeetha Sringeri was born in Sringeri into a defense family. Her father, Shiva Kumar K is an ex-serviceman in the Indian Air Force and her mother, Bhavani Shiva Kumar is a herbal wellness coach. Sringeri is a NCC cadet and represented Karnataka in Kho kho, bagging a gold medal in 2012.

Career 
Sringeri entered acting through Star Suvarna's Hara Hara Mahadeva. The mythological drama brought her nickname Sati/Parvathi. She later went on to participate in the Super Jodi reality show organised by the same channel.

Her first feature film was A+, which released in 2018 She had gone through over 50 scripts before signing the movie A+ Kannada Movie. A+ was a subtle sequel of Upendra's cult classic "A"; the film was directed by Upendra's associate Vijay Surya. The film brought critical acclaim to Sangeetha for her portrayal of Yashaswini in the film.

Sringeri's next big break was in 2022, as lead actress opposite to Rakshit Shetty in 777 Charlie, produced by Paramvah Studios and presented by Pushkar Films. Sangeetha was picked up to audition for the movie through Facebook, and she bagged the role amongst 2,700 other entries. Later that year, she also acted in Lucky Man and Pampa Panchalli Parashivamurthy.

Filmography

Films

Television

References

Living people
Actresses from Karnataka
Actresses from Bangalore
Indian film actresses
Actresses in Kannada cinema
21st-century Indian actresses
Year of birth missing (living people)